A magnetosonic wave, also called a magnetoacoustic wave, is a linear magnetohydrodynamic (MHD) wave that is driven by thermal pressure, magnetic pressure, and magnetic tension. There are two types of magnetosonic waves, the fast magnetosonic wave and the slow magnetosonic wave. Both fast and slow magnetosonic waves are present in the solar corona providing an observational foundation for the technique for coronal plasma diagnostics, coronal seismology.

Homogeneous plasma 
In an ideal homogeneous plasma of infinite extent, and in the absence of gravity, the fast and slow magnetosonic waves form, together with the Alfvén wave, the three basic linear MHD waves. Under the assumption of normal modes, namely that the linear perturbations of the physical quantities are of the form

(with  the constant amplitude), a dispersion relation of the magnetosonic waves can be derived from the system of ideal MHD equations:

This equation can be solved for the frequency , yielding the frequencies of the fast and slow magnetosonic waves:

It can be shown that  (with  the Alfvén frequency), hence the name of "slow" and "fast" magnetosonic waves.

Limiting cases

Absent magnetic field 
In the absence of a magnetic field, the whole MHD model reduces to the hydrodynamics (HD) model. The slow wave thus disappears from the system, while the fast wave is just a sound wave, propagating isotropically.

Incompressible plasma 
The slow wave thus propagates with the Alfvén speed (although it remains different from an Alfvén wave in its nature), while the fast wave disappears from the system.

Cold plasma 
Under the assumption that the background temperature , it follows from the ideal gas law that the thermal pressure  and thus that . Hence there are no slow waves in the system, and the fast waves propagate isotropically with the Alfvén speed.

Inhomogeneous plasma 
In the case of an inhomogeneous plasma (that is, a plasma where at least one of the background quantities is not constant) the MHD waves lose their defining nature and get mixed properties. In some setups, such as the axisymmetric waves in a straight cylinder with a circular basis (one of the simplest models for a coronal loop), the three MHD waves can still be clearly distinguished. But in general, the pure Alfvén and fast and slow magnetosonic waves don't exist, and the waves in the plasma are coupled to each other in intricate ways.

See also 
 Waves in plasmas
 Alfvén wave
 Ion acoustic wave
 Coronal seismology
 Magnetogravity wave

References 

Waves in plasmas